The 2019 Pan American Judo Championships was held in Lima, Peru from 25 to 27 April 2019.

Results

Men's events

Women's events

Mixed event

Medal table

References

External links
 
 Pan American Judo Confederation

2019
American Championships
International sports competitions hosted by Peru
Pan American Judo Championships
Sports competitions in Lima
Pan American Judo Championships